Cyclosalpa is a genus of salps, marine tunicates in the class Thaliacea.

References 

 Cyclosalpa at WoRMS

Thaliacea
Tunicate genera